The 115th New York State Legislature, consisting of the New York State Senate and the New York State Assembly, met from January 5 to April 26, 1892, during the first year of Roswell P. Flower's governorship, in Albany.

Background
Under the provisions of the New York Constitution of 1846, 32 Senators and 128 assemblymen were elected in single-seat districts; senators for a two-year term, assemblymen for a one-year term. The senatorial districts were made up of entire counties, except New York County (seven districts) and Kings County (three districts). The Assembly districts were made up of entire towns, or city wards, forming a contiguous area, all within the same county.

At this time there were two major political parties: the Democratic Party and the Republican Party. In New York City, the Democrats were split into three factions: Tammany Hall, the "County Democracy" and the "New York Democracy". The Prohibition Party and the Socialist Labor Party also nominated tickets.

Elections
The New York state election, 1891 was held on November 3. Roswell P. Flower was elected Governor; and Speaker William F. Sheehan was elected Lieutenant Governor, both Democrats. The other five statewide elective offices up for election were also carried by the Democrats. The approximate party strength at this election, as expressed by the vote for Governor, was: Democratic 585,000; Republican 535,000; Prohibition 30,000; and Socialist Labor 15,000.

This was the first time that seats in the Legislature were contested in the courts. Previously, since Independence in 1777, seats could be contested only in the Legislature, after the beginning of the session, and it took usually a long time to come to a conclusion. Most contestants whose claims were found to be correct, were seated only a few days before the end of the session. Now it became possible to take the contest to the courts, swiftly being decided by New York Court of Appeals, before the session began. At this time, the Court of Appeals was composed of five Democrats and two Republicans, and ruled in favor of Democrats Edward B. Osborne, John A. Nichols and Charles E. Walker who were referred to in the press as "usurpers", holding their seats by fraud. Seven more seats were then contested in the Legislature.

Sessions
The Legislature met for the regular session at the State Capitol in Albany on January 5, 1892; and adjourned on April 25.

Robert P. Bush (D) was elected Speaker with 65 votes against 55 for James W. Husted (R).

Jacob A. Cantor (D) was elected president pro tempore of the State Senate with 15 votes against 14 for George Z. Erwin (R).

On January 13, the Democratic senators met in caucus to discuss the scheme of unseating Republicans John H. Derby and Harvey J. Donaldson. Senator William L. Brown refused to go along with the scheme.

On January 14, Senators George Z. Erwin, Edmund O'Connor and Charles T. Saxton (all three Rep.) refused to vote on a substitute Enumeration Bill, and were declared in contempt by the Democratic majority.

On January 20, the Enumeration Bill was finally passed. It had been due in 1885, but Republicans and Democrats could not agree on the terms. The Census Bill passed by Republican majorities in the Legislature of 1885 was vetoed by Gov. David B. Hill. In 1892, for the first time since 1885 the majorities in both Houses of the Legislature and the Governor were of the same party, and the enumeration bill was rushed through. The enumeration was needed as a basis for the re-apportionment of the Senate and Assembly districts.

On February 10, the Legislature elected James F. Crooker (Dem.) as Superintendent of Public Instruction, with 81 votes against 71 for Andrew S. Draper (Rep.), to succeed Draper on April 7 for a term of three years.

The Legislature met for a special session on April 25, at 8.30 p.m., to consider the re-apportionment of the Senate districts and the number of assemblymen per county.

On April 26, the Re-Apportionment Bill was passed by a vote of 17 to 1 (the 14 Republicans refused to vote) in the Senate; and by a vote of 67 to 58 in the Assembly. Cattaraugus, Cayuga, Chautauqua, Jefferson, Niagara, Oneida, Oswego, Otsego, Saratoga, Ulster, Washington and Wayne counties lost one seat each; St. Lawrence County lost two seats; Erie and Queens counties gained one seat each; and Kings and New York counties gained six seats each.

On August 5, Monroe County Judge Rumsey declared the Re-Apportionment Bill as unconstitutional and void.

On September 23, Supreme Court Justice Stephen L. Mayham declared the Re-Apportionment Bill as constitutional.

On October 13, the Court of Appeals upheld the Re-Apportionment Bill by a party vote of 5 to 2.

State Senate

Districts

Note: There are now 62 counties in the State of New York. The counties which are not mentioned in this list had not yet been established, or sufficiently organized, the area being included in one or more of the abovementioned counties.

Members
The asterisk (*) denotes members of the previous Legislature who continued in office as members of this Legislature. Joseph Aspinall, Martin T. McMahon, Charles P. McClelland, Edward B. Osborne, Cornelius R. Parsons and Matthias Endres changed from the Assembly to the Senate.

Note: For brevity, the chairmanships omit the words "...the Committee on (the)..."

Employees
 Clerk: Charles T. Dunning
Assistant Clerk: Charles W. Sutherland
 Sergeant-at-Arms: Adelbert E. Tallmadge
 Doorkeeper: Joseph Jerge
 Stenographer: James M. Ruso

State Assembly

Assemblymen

The asterisk (*) denotes members of the previous Legislature who continued as members of this Legislature.

Note: For brevity, the chairmanships omit the words "...the Committee on (the)..."

Employees
 Clerk: Charles R. DeFreest
 Sergeant-at-Arms: Michael B. Redmond
 Doorkeeper: Edward A. Moore
 First Assistant Doorkeeper: Lawrence D. Fitzpatrick
 Second Assistant Doorkeeper: Kenneth D. L. Nivin
 Stenographer: Thomas Hassett

Notes

Sources
 The New York Red Book compiled by Will L. Lloyd (published by James B. Lyon, Albany NY, 1892; see pg. 387 for list of senators; pg. 77–103 for senators' bios; pg. 410ff for list of assemblymen; pg. 104–175 for assemblymen's bios; and pg. 406f for senate and assembly committees)
 The New York Red Book compiled by Edgar L. Murlin (published by James B. Lyon, Albany NY, 1897; see pg. 384f for senate districts; and pg. 410–417 for Assembly districts)
 Manual for the Use of the Legislature (1892; pg. 369 and 422ff)
 THE REPUBLICANS WEAKEN in NYT on January 6, 1892

115
1892 in New York (state)
1892 U.S. legislative sessions